An open contact is a term used in dentistry to describe the space between adjacent teeth when the teeth are neither touching nor a sufficient distance from each other to potentially allow the space to naturally remain free of debris.

Open contacts can exist naturally, such as when teeth erupt into a nonideal occlusion or when they shift as a result of tooth loss.  They are also frequently produced as a result of inadequately contoured dental restorations.

An open contact may lead to a phenomenon termed food packing/food impaction, which can be a cause of pain.

References

Periodontal disorders